Stiviandra Oliveira (born 1989, in Huíla) is an Angolan model and winner of Miss Angola 2006.

Oliveira was also crowned Miss World Africa at the 2006 Miss World competition.

Starting the year 2017, Stiviandra, under the supervision of the Comite Miss Angola, will be the National Director of Miss Earth Angola.

References

External links
SAPO Videos video clip of Olivera

1989 births
Living people
Angolan beauty pageant winners
Angolan female models
Miss Angola winners
Miss World 2006 delegates
People from Huíla Province